St. Mary's Church is a Church of England church located in Welwyn, Hertfordshire, in the United Kingdom. It is north of the River Mimram and within the Welwyn conservation area. The present church building is a grade II listed building.

History 
The chancel and nave of the church were built in the thirteenth century, most likely on the site of a destroyed Saxon chapel. The nave was modified to include a nave aisle in 1662, and its tower was rebuilt at this time. The church was further expanded between 1867-1870 with the addition of an organ chamber, a vestry and a choir aisle. The present tower was built in 1910 and the church house, constructed on the former northern part of the churchyard, was built in 2007.

Current use 
As of November 2020, the church is open daily to members of the public.

References

External links 

Home - Official church site

Grade II listed churches in Hertfordshire
Churches in Hertfordshire
Religious buildings and structures completed in 1662